Hidari irava, commonly known as the coconut skipper, is a species of butterfly in the family Hesperiidae. It is found in southern Myanmar, Thailand, western Malaysia, as well as on Sumatra, Java, Borneo and the Sula Islands.

The wingspan is 45–55 mm.

The larvae feed on Bambusa species and Cocos nucifera.

References

 Hidari irava Butterflies of Peninsular Malaysia
  

Erionotini
Butterflies of Indochina
Butterflies described in 1858